Antonella Roncelli (born 1 May 1959) is an Italian former backstroke swimmer. She competed in three events at the 1976 Summer Olympics.

References

External links
 

1959 births
Living people
Italian female backstroke swimmers
Olympic swimmers of Italy
Swimmers at the 1976 Summer Olympics
Place of birth missing (living people)
20th-century Italian women